The Communauté de communes de Londinières is located in the Seine-Maritime département of the Normandy region of north-western France. It was created on 11 December 2000 and its seat is Londinières. Its area is 194.6 km2, and its population was 5,255 in 2018.

Composition
The communauté de communes consists of the following 16 communes:

Bailleul-Neuville
Baillolet
Bures-en-Bray
Clais
Croixdalle
Fréauville
Fresnoy-Folny
Grandcourt
Londinières
Osmoy-Saint-Valery
Preuseville
Puisenval
Saint-Pierre-des-Jonquières
Sainte-Agathe-d'Aliermont
Smermesnil
Wanchy-Capval

See also
Communes of the Seine-Maritime department

References

Londinieres
Londinieres